Laxminarayan Payodhi (born 1957) is an Indian poet, storywriter, novelist, playwright, critic, editor, and researcher.

Personal life and education

Laxminarayan Payodhi was born on 23 March 1957 in the village of Ankisa Mal in Maharashtra and grew up in Bhopalpatnam (Bijapur district), Chhattisgarh. He was born in a Telugu speaking family. Though a student of Hindi, Payodhi took interest in various Vedas and epics. He became an authority on languages: Telugu and Hindi. He is popular by his pen name Payodhi, which means "sea of milk".

Payodhi is educated in the Hindi medium. His early education was in Bhopalpattnam, before the government sent him to other institutes for further studies. Thereon, he moved to Jagdalpur and then to Raipur for his graduation and for his master's degree in Hindi literature and sociology, from Ravishankar University. Growing up, he took inspiration from personalities like Ramakrishna Paramhansa, Suryakant Tripathi 'Nirala', Swami Vivekananda and Adishankaracharya. He married his wife Bhagyarekha. Living in Bhopal from last 25 years, he set various examples by contributing a lot to tribes of Madhya Pradesh.

Career 
Payodhi is a poet of modern Hindi. He started publishing his books of poems in Hindi and is best known for his early work Somaru, which was a bestseller and has been published three times (1992, 1997, 2005). His work spanned other fields of Hindi literature as a storywriter, novelist, playwright, critic, and editor. He was editor of the magazine Samajh Jharokha for tribal children. He has done research on tribal languages, lifestyle and culture, promoting preferment for the tribes of Madhya Pradesh.

Literary works

Poetry
 Somaru (1992, 1997, 2005)
 Aakhetakhon ke Viruddh (1997)
 Ant mein bachi Kavita (2000)
 Gamak (Ghazals, 2002)
 Harshit hai Brahmand (Lyrics, 2003–2004)
 Kandeel mein Suraj (Ghazals, 2005)
 Punarapi (selected poems, 2005)
 Chuppiyon ka Bayaan (Ghazals, 2008)
 Andhere ke paar (Ghazals, 2011)
 Chintalnaar se Chintalnaar tak (Poems, 2012)
 Sugandhon Ka Safar (Ghazals, 2015)
 Ujaalon ki Talaash (Ghazals & lyrics, 2017)
 Lamjhana (Poems, 2018)
 Samay ka Naad (Poems, 2018)
 Khayalon ki Dhoop (Ghazals, 2018)

Stories
 Sambandhon ke Avaj Mein (1992)

Drama
 Gundadhoor (Poetic Drama, 2018)

Research books
 Gondi-Hindi shabd kosh (Dictionary, 2006)
 Bhili-Hindi shabd kosh Dictionary, 2007)
 Korku-Hindi shabd kosh (Dictionary 2007)
 Gond Janjati Ka Sanskratik Pralekh (Culture of Gond Tribe, 2006)
 Janjatiya Godna: Shrungar aur upchaar (2012)
 Bhil Janaati Samuh Ke Saanskritik Aayaam (Culture of Bhil Tribal Group, 2015)
 Dhangana (Coffee table book on Baigapainting, 2017)

Children's literature
 Vanvaasi Krantiveer (1990)
 Languron K Desh Mein (1996)
 Ababeel Ki Saheli (2000)
 Ghonsala Bola (2005)
 Adivasi Kranti Nayak (2005)
 Thibaru (Novel, 1992)
 Suraj ke Desh mein (Novel, 2005)
 Titali Pari (Drama, 1998)
 Uttar ban Jayen (Poems, 2005)
 Uunche Rakhen Iraade (Poems, 2005)
 Adivaasi Bachchon ke Khel (Encyclopedia on tribal games, In two parts, 2005)

Other works
 Telefilm 'Mahuphool'(based on short story 'Mahue ke Phool) and tele dama 'Bhoomkal'( based on Gundadhoor)
 Translated 'Somaru' in Marathi and English and 'Kandeel mein Sooraj' in Urdu.
 Some of the poems and stories have been translated into Urdu, Telugu, Halbi, and Sindhi.
 Some of the stories and poems have included in the syllabus of m.p board and C.B.S.E
 Gundadhoor, Somaru, Harshit hai Brahmand, Gamak and even him as a personality is been matter of study of PhD and D lit. for many researchers.
 6. There had been a program called 'Somaru- Prasang' by karvat Kala Parishad (1997)
 An event called 'Payodhi- Prasang' by janhit prakashan and was organized to discuss Payodhi's literature.(2002)
 Vande Matram Samiti organized Ghazal eve on Payodhi's creation. Twice, once on 'Gamak' in 2002 and then for 'Andhere ke Paar' in 2011.

Editing
 Samajh jharokha (govt.monthely magazine for children)
 Vimarsh (about criticism)
 Gondi- Hindi dictionary
 Bhili- Hindi dictionary
 Korku -Hindi dictionary
 Sampark and Sandhaan (newsletter of Tribal Welfare Department, Madhya Pradesh)
 Research bulletin (Tribal Research and Development Institute, Madhya Pradesh)
 Korku Vyakaran
 Bhili Vyakaran
 Kaargil ki Goonj (Poems)

Honors and awards
 Indravati Award.(1982) Kondagaon.
 Ambika Prasad 'Divya' Puraskar: 'Sambandhon k Avej Mein' (1993), Harshit hai Brahmaand (2008), Madhya Pradesh Rashtra Bhasha Prachaar Samiti.
 Kadambinee Puraskar, (1995), Hindustan Times.
 Pt. Ravi Shankar Shukla Puraskar. (1996)Madhya Pradesh Saahitya Academy
 Pavaiya Puraskar: (2007) Kala Mandir.
 A special award for dictionary of 3 tribal languages (Bheeli, Korku, Gondi). (2008) Tribal Welfare Department, Government of Madhya Pradesh.
 Bhartiya bal kalyan sansthan, (1996) (contribution for children's literature)
 Vasant Rao Uikey Samman (2002), Vasant Rao Uikey Smruti Sansthan, for tribal emotions in Hindi literature.
 Special honor for children's literature (2008) Bal Kalyan evam Bal Sahitya Shodh Kendra.
 Bhasha Bharti samman (2010) Karvat Kala parishad.
 Sudeergh Samman:Baalinaath Shodh Samsthaan, Ujjain
 Nagrik Samman(2015) Nagrik kalyan samiti, Bhopal
 Kamleshwar Award from the Dushyant Museum

References

 "Bastar ka kavyapurush Somaru" (kala karvat- April 1997)
 Dr. Lata Agarwal's "Payodhi Ho janey Ka Arth"(Criticism, 2013)

External links 
 

Indian male poets
Poets from Maharashtra
Poets from Chhattisgarh
Living people
1957 births